Playing with Destiny is a 1924 German silent film directed by Siegfried Philippi and starring Alfred Abel, Sascha Gura and Claire Rommer.

The film's sets were designed by the art director Robert A. Dietrich.

Cast
 Alfred Abel as Albert Unna
 Sascha Gura as Eva Loray
 Olga Engl as Alberts Mutter
 Claire Rommer as Elena
 Margarete Kupfer as Mittenzweys Freundin
 Vera Skidelsky as Beider Tochter
 Charles Willy Kayser as Friedrich Bessel
 Fritz Schulz as Heinrich Höther
 Rudolf Lettinger as Ortsgeistlicher
 Jakob Tiedtke as Redakteur Mittenzwey
 Frida Richard as Dessen Frau
 Leopold von Ledebur as Theaterdirektor
 Hermann Picha as Jerusalem
 Fritz Beckmann
 Paul Rehkopf

References

Bibliography
 Bock, Hans-Michael & Bergfelder, Tim. The Concise CineGraph. Encyclopedia of German Cinema. Berghahn Books, 2009.
 Gerhard Lamprecht. Deutsche Stummfilme, Volume 8.

External links

1924 films
Films of the Weimar Republic
German silent feature films
Films directed by Siegfried Philippi
German black-and-white films
1920s German films